Philip Meadows may refer to:

Philip Meadows (died 1718), English diplomat and official
Philip Meadows (died 1781), deputy ranger of Windsor Park
Philip Meadowes, English politician and diplomat, son of Philip Meadows (died 1718)